This list of rivers in Scotland is organised geographically, taken anti-clockwise, from Berwick-upon-Tweed. Tributaries are listed down the page in an upstream direction. (L) indicates a left-bank tributary and (R) indicates a right-bank tributary whilst (Ls) and (Rs) indicate left and right forks where a named river is formed from two differently named rivers.

For simplicity, they are divided here by the coastal section in which the mouth of the river can be found. Those on Scottish islands can be found in a section at the end. For Scottish estuaries, please see under firths and sea lochs.

The Scots have many words for watercourses.                                   
 A "Water" (Lallans: "Watter", Scots Gaelic, "Uisge") is a smaller river, e.g. Ugie Water, Water of Leith etc. Many Scottish rivers incorporate the name "Water" traditionally.
A "burn", Scots Gaelic: "allt" (anglicised as "Ault/alt"), used for smaller rivers and larger streams, also once widely used in England, now mostly in placenames especially the north, and sometimes spelled "bourne", e.g. Bournemouth and Ashbourne. In Scotland examples include Coalburn, Bannockburn, Aultmore.
Abhainn in Gaelic meaning river, which is anglicised as Avon. There is also a similar Brythonic cognate. This sometimes leads to curious 'double' namings of rivers by Anglo-Saxon speakers, such as River Avon and River Afton (literally "River River").

South-eastern Scotland

Flowing into the North Sea between Berwick-upon-Tweed and Kincardine (East Coast)

The right-bank tributary of the Tweed, the River Till together with its tributaries, is almost wholly within England but is included for completeness of the Tweed catchment.

Tweed catchment
 River Tweed
 Whiteadder Water (L)
 Blackadder Water (R)
 Langton Burn (L)
 Monynut Water (L)
 Dye Water (R)
 Bothwell Water (L)
 Faseny Water (R)
 River Till (R) (England only) (is known as River Breamish in upper reaches)
 River Glen (L), (England only)
 Bowmont Water (Ls) (upper reaches in Scotland)
 College Burn (Rs), (England only)
 Wooler Water (L), (England only)
 Carey Burn (Ls) (England only)
 Harthope Burn (Rs) (England only)
 Hetton Burn (R) (England only)
 Lilburn Burn (Ls) (England only)
 River Breamish (Rs) (England only)
 Harelaw Burn (L) (England only)
 Linhope Burn (L) (England only)
 Leet Water (L)
 Eden Water (L)
 River Teviot (R)
 Kale Water (R)
 Oxnam Water (R)
 Jed Water (R)
 Black Burn (R)
 Ale Water (L)
 Rule Water (R)
 Slitrig Water (R)
 Borthwick Water (L)
 Allan Water (R)
 Leader Water (L)
 Boondreigh Water (L)
 Earnscleugh Water (L)
 Darnick Burn (R)
 Gala Water (L)
 Heriot Water (R)
 Ettrick Water (R)
 Yarrow Water (L)
 Megget Water (L) (enters St Mary's Loch)
 Rankle Burn (R)
 Tima Water (R)
 Leithen Water (L)
 Quair Water (R)
 Eddleston Water (L)
 Manor Water (R)
 Lyne Water (L)
 Holms Water (L)
 Biggar Water (L)
 Kingledoors Burn (L)
 Talla Water (R)
 Fruid Water (R)
Simple coastal catchments
 Eye Water
 Ale Water (L)
 Biel Water
Tyne catchment
 River Tyne
 Tyne Water (Ls)
 Birns Water (Rs) (Humbie Water)
Firth of Forth (Estuary)

(Lothian) Esk catchment
 River Esk, Lothian
 River South Esk (Rs)
 Gore Water (R)
 Dalhousie Burn
 River North Esk (Ls)
 Figgate Burn
Water of Leith catchment
 Water of Leith
 The Stank
Almond catchment
 River Almond
 Linhouse Water (R)
 Breich Water (R)
 Gogarburn

Avon catchment
 River Avon
Carron catchment
 River Carron
 Bonny Water (R)
 Earl's Burn (L)

Forth to Tay

Flowing into the North Sea between Kincardine and Buddon Ness (East Coast)

Forth catchment
 River Forth
 Pow Burn (R)
  River Devon, Clackmannanshire (L)
 Black Devon (L)
 Bannock Burn (R)
 Allan Water (L)
 River Teith (L)
 Ardoch Burn (L)
 Keltie Water (L)
 Garbh Uisge (Ls) (drains Loch Lubnaig)
 Eas Gobhain (Rs) (drains Loch Venachar)
 Goodie Water (L)
 Kelty Water (R)
 Duchray Water (R)
Simple coastal catchments
 River Leven, Fife
 River Ore (R)
 Kenly Water
 Kinness Burn
Eden catchment
 River Eden, Fife
 Motray Water (L)
 Ceres Burn (R)
Tay catchment
 River Tay
 River Earn (L)
 River Farg (R)
 Water of May (R)
 Ruthven Water (R)
 Machany Water (R)
 Shaggie Burn (L)
 Turret Burn (R)
 River Lednock (L)
 Water of Ruchill (R)
 Burn of Ample (R) (flows into Loch Earn)
 Kendrum Burn (R) (flows into Loch Earn)
 Allt Srath a' Ghlinne (L)
 River Almond, Perthshire (R)
 Shochie Burn (R)
 Ordie Burn (L)
 River Isla, Perthshire (L)
 River Ericht (L)
 Lunan Burn (R)
 Lornty Burn (R)
 Shee Water (known as Black Water in its lower reaches) (Ls)
 Allt a' Ghlinne Bhig (L)
 Glen Lochsie Burn (R)
 River Ardle (Rs)
 Allt Fearnach (Ls)
 Brerachan Water (Rs)
 Dean Water (R)
 Alyth Burn (R)
 Melgam Water (L)
 River Braan (R)
 Ballinloan Burn (L)
 Cochill Burn (L)
 River Quaich (flows into Loch Freuchie)
 River Tummel (L)
 River Garry (L)
 Allt Girnaig (L)
 River Tilt (L)
 Tarf Water (R)
 Errochty Water (R)
 Edendon Water (L)
 Allt Camghouran (R) (enters Loch Rannoch)
 River Ericht (L)
 River Gaur (enters Loch Rannoch)
 Abhainn Duibhe (R)
 Allt Chaldar (L)
 Allt Eigheach (L) (enters Loch Eigheach)
 Garbh Ghaoir (enters Loch Eigheach)
 Abhainn Bà (enters Loch Laidon) (known as River Bà upstream of Loch Bà)
 Bruar Water (L)??
 River Lyon (L)
 Keltney Burn (L) (upper reaches known as Allt Mor)
 Allt Conait (L)
 River Lochay (Ls) (enters Loch Tay)
 River Dochart (Rs) (enters Loch Tay)
Simple coastal catchments
 Dighty Water
 Buddon Burn

East Coast
Flowing into the North Sea between Buddon Ness and Rattray Head

Simple coastal catchments
 Pitairlie Burn
 Monikie Burn
 Elliot Water
 Rottenraw Burn
 Brothock Burn
 Keilor Burn
 Lunan Water
River South Esk catchment
 River South Esk
 Noran Water (L)
 Prosen Water (R)
 Burn of Glenmoye (L)
 White Water (R)
River North Esk catchment
 River North Esk
 Luther Water (L)
 West Water (R) (upper reaches known as Water of Saughs)
 Water of Tarf (L)
 Water of Mark (Ls)
 Water of Lee (Rs)
Simple coastal catchments
 Bervie Water
 Carron Water, Aberdeenshire
 Cowie Water
 Burn of Monboys
 Cowton Burn
 Burn of Muchalls
 Burn of Pheppie
 Burn of Elsick
 Burn of Findon
Dee catchment
 River Dee, Aberdeenshire
 Crynoch Burn (R)
 Cairnie Burn (L)
 Gormack Burn (L)
 Leuchar Burn (L)
 Burn of Sheeoch (R)
 Water of Feugh (R)
Beltie Burn (L)
 Burn of Canny (L)
 Tarland Burn (L)
 Water of Tanar (R)
 Tullich Burn (L)
 River Muick (R)
 River Gairn (L)
 Glenfenzie Burn (L) (minor)
 Girnock Burn (R)
 Clunie Water (R)
 Callater Burn (R)
 Quoich Water (L)
 Ey Burn (R)
 Lui Water (L)
 Derry Burn (Ls)
 Luibeg Burn (Rs)
 Geldie Burn (R)
Don catchment
 River Don, Aberdeenshire
 Elrick Burn (L)
 River Ury (L) (sometimes written River Urie)
 Gadie Burn (minor?)
 Ton Burn (R)
 Birks Burn (minor?)
 Mossat Burn (L)
 Kindie Burn (L)
 Water of Buchat (L)
 Deskry Burn (R)
 Water of Nochty (L)
 Ernan Water (L)
 Water of Carvie (R) (minor)
Simple coastal catchments
 Blackdog Burn
 Potterton Burn
 Millden Burn ??
 Eigie Burn ??
 Blairton Burn ??
 Menie Burn ??
 Sandend Burn ??
Ythan catchment
 River Ythan
 Tarty Burn (R)
 Ebrie Burn (L)
 Little Water (L)
 Fordoun Burn (R)
Simple coastal catchments
 Water of Cruden
 River Ugie
 South Ugie Water (Rs)
 Burn of Fedderate (L)
 North Ugie Water (Ls)
 Cuttie Burn (?minor)
 Black Water (?minor)

Moray Firth (south coast)
Flowing into the North Sea between Rattray Head and Inverness

Simple coastal catchments
 Water of Philorth
 Pouk Burn
 The Dour
 Tore Burn
Deveron catchment
 River Deveron
 Idoch Water (R)
 Burn of Forgue (R)
 River Isla, Moray (L)
 Burn of Cairnie (R)
 Burn of Davidston (R)
 River Bogie (R)
Simple coastal catchments
 Burn of Boyndie
 Burn of Boyne
 Burn of Durn
 Burn of Fordyce
 Cullen Burn
 Burn of Deskford
 Glen Burn
 Burn of Buckie
 Burn of Tynet
Spey catchment
 River Spey
 Burn of Fochabers (R)
 Burn of Rothes (L)
 River Fiddich (R)
 Dullan Water (L)
 Knockando Burn (L)
 Allt Arder (L)
 Allt a' Ghealaidh (L)
 River Avon
 River Livet (R)
 Burn of Lochy (L) ('Burn of Brown' above Bridge of Brown)
 Conglass Water (R)
 Water of Ailnack (L) (known as Water of Caiplich in its upper reaches)
 River Dulnain (L)
 River Nethy (R)
 Dorback Burn (R)
 River Druie (R)
 River Luineag (R)
 Am Beanaidh (L)
 River Feshie (R)
 Allt Chomhraig (L)
 River Eidart (R)
 River Tromie (R)
 Allt Mor (L)
 River Calder (L)
 River Truim (R)
 River Mashie (R)
 Markie Burn (L)
Lossie catchment
 River Lossie
 Black Burn (L)
 Leanoch Burn (R)
Findhorn catchment
 River Findhorn
 Burn of Mosset (R) (drains into Findhorn Bay)
 Muckle Burn (R)  (drains into Findhorn Bay)
 Dorback Burn (R)
 River Divie (R)
 Leonach Burn (R)
 Rhilean Burn (L)
 Funtack Burn (L) ('Moy Burn' above Loch Moy)
 Glen Mazeran (L)??
 Elrick Burn (R)
 River Eskin (L)
Nairn catchment
 River Nairn
 Allt Dearg (R)
 Riereach Burn (R)
 River Farnack (R)
Ness catchment
 River Ness
 River Farigaig (R) (flows into Loch Ness)
 River Enrick (L) (flows into Loch Ness)
 River Coiltie (L) (flows into Loch Ness)
 River Foyers (R) (flows into Loch Ness)
 River Fechlin (L)
 Allt Breineag (L)
 River E (L) (flows into Loch Mhòr)
 River Moriston (L)  (flows into Loch Ness)
 Allt Bhlaraidh (L)
 River Doe (L)
 River Loyne (R)
 Allt Doe (R) (flows into Loch Ness)
 River Oich (L)? (flows into Loch Ness)
 River Garry  (flows into Loch Oich)
 River Tarff (R) (flows into Loch Ness)

Moray Firth (north coast)
Flowing into the North Sea between Inverness and Duncansby Head (East Coast)

Moniack catchment
 Moniack Burn (flows into Beauly Firth)
Beauly catchment
 River Beauly
Belladrum Burn (R)
 Bruiach Burn (R)
 Breakachy Burn (L)
River Farrar (Ls)
River Glass (Rs)
River Cannich (L)
River Affric (L)
Abhainn Deabhag (R)
Conon catchment
 River Conon
 River Orrin (R)
 Allt Goibhre (R)
 Black Water (L)
 River Meig (R)
Simple coastal catchments
 River Peffery
 River Sgitheach
 Allt Graad (or River Glass, known as Abhainn Beinn nan Eun above Loch Glass)
 Allt nan Caorach (R)
 River Averon (also known as River Alness) (known as Abhainn na Glasa above Loch Morie)
 Black Water (L)
 Balnagown River (known as Strathrory River upstream)
 River Tain (flows into Dornoch Firth)
 Wester Fearn Burn (flows into Dornoch Firth)
Carron catchment
 River Carron (flows into Kyle of Sutherland/Dornoch Firth)
 Black Water (L) (known in upper reaches as Abhainn an t-Srath Chuileannaidh)
 Water of Glencalvie (R) (Diebidale River in its upper reaches)
 Alladale River (Ls)
 Abhainn a' Ghlinne Mhoir (Rs) (known as Abhainn a' Ghlinne Bhig in its upper reaches)
Oykel catchment
 River Oykel (flows into Kyle of Sutherland)
 River Cassley (L)
 River Einig (R) (upper reaches are known as Rappach Water)
 Abhainn Dubhag (R) (upper reaches are known as Corriemulzie River)
Shin catchment
 River Shin (flows into Kyle of Sutherland)
 Grudie Burn (R)
 River Tirry (L) (flows into Loch Shin)
 River Fiag (L) (flows into Loch Shin)
 Merkland River (L) (flows into Loch Shin via Loch a' Ghriama)
Simple coastal catchments
 River Evelix
 River Fleet
 Abhainn an t-Sratha Charnaig (R)
 Lettie River (L) (also known as Abhainn Leataidh)
 Golspie Burn
Brora catchment
 River Brora
 Black Water (L)
 River Skinsdale (L)
Simple coastal catchments
 River Loth ?
 River Helmsdale (River Ullie)
 Abhainn na Frithe (R)
 Bannock Burn (L)
 Berriedale Water
 Langwell Water (R)
 Dunbeath Water
Wick catchment
 Wick River
 Strath Burn (R)
 Scouthal Burn (L)
 Burn of Lyth

North Coast

Flowing into the Atlantic Ocean between Dunnet Head and Cape Wrath

Thurso catchment
 River Thurso
 Little River, Highland
 Sleach Water (L) (flows into Loch More
Simple coastal catchments
 Forss Water (known by several other names upstream of Loch Shurrery)
 Achvarasdal Burn
 Sandside Burn
 Halladale River
 River Dyke (L)
 River Strathy
 Armadale Burn
 River Naver
 River Borgie
 Kinloch River
Hope catchment
 River Hope (known as Strathmore River above Loch Hope)
 Glen Golly River (Ls)
 Abhainn Srath Coir' an Easaidh (Rs)
Simple coastal catchments
 Amhainn an t-Sratha Bhig
 River Dionard
 Daill River
 Kearvaig River

North-west Highlands

Flowing into the Atlantic Ocean between Cape Wrath and Corpach at the head of Loch Linnhe

Simple coastal catchments
 Keisgaig River (minor)
 Sandwood River
 Rhiconich River
 River Laxford
 River Inver
 River Traligill (flows into Loch Assynt)
 River Loanan  (flows into Loch Assynt)
 Abhainn Bad na h-Achlaise (known as Abhainn na Clach Airigh upstream)
Kirkaig catchment
 River Kirkaig
 Abhainn a' Chrocain (L) (flows into Loch Veyatie)
 Abhainn Mor (R) (flows into Loch Veyatie)
 Ledmore River (flows into Cam Loch)
 Ledbeg River (R)
Simple coastal catchments
 River Polly
 River Canaird (or Kanaird)
 River Runie (R)
 Ullapool River (known as Rhidorroch River upstream of Loch Achall and River Douchary further upstream)
 River Lael
 River Broom
 Abhainn Cuileig (Ls)
 Abhainn Droma (Rs)
 Dundonnell River
 Gruinard River (Abhainn Srath na Sealga upstream of Loch na Sealga)
 Allt Loch a Ghiubhsachan (L)
 Inverianvie River
 Little Gruinard River
Ewe catchment
 River Ewe
 River Talladale (L) (flows into Loch Maree)
 River Grudie (L) (flows into Loch Maree)
 Abhainn an Fhasaigh (R) (flows into Loch Maree)
 Kinlochewe River (flows into Loch Maree)
 A' Ghairbhe (Ls)
 Abhainn Bruachaig (Rs)
Simple coastal catchments
 River Sand
 River Kerry
 Badachro River (known as Abhainn Braigh-horrisdale upstream of Loch Braigh Horrisdale)
 River Erradale
 Craig River
 River Torridon
 River Balgy
 River Applecross
 River Toscaig
 River Kishorn
 River Carron
 Fionn Abhainn (R)
 River Lair (R)
 River Taodail
 River Attadale
 River Ling
 Uisge Dubh (or Black Water)
 River Elchaig
 Allt a' Ghlomaich (L)
 River Glennan (minor)
 River Croe
 Abhainn Chonaig (R)
 River Shiel
 Glenmore River
 Abhainn a' Ghlinne Bhig
 River Arnisdale
 River Barrisdale
 Abhainn Inbhir Ghuiserein
 Inverie River
 River Carnach
 River Morar
 River Meoble (L) (flows into Loch Morar)
 River Ailort
 River Moidart
Shiel catchment
 River Shiel
 River Polloch (L) (flows into Loch Shiel)
 Glenalladale River (R) (flows into Loch Shiel)
 River Finna (R) (flows into head of Loch Shiel)
 Callop River (L) (flows into head of Loch Shiel)
Simple coastal catchments
 Glenmore River
 Strontian River
 Carnoch River
 Glencripesdale Burn
 Kinloch River
 Barr River
 Savary River
Aline catchment
 River Aline
 Abhainn a' Ghlinne Ghil (Ls)
 Black Water (Rs)
Simple coastal catchments
 Rannoch River
 Glensanda River (minor)
 River Tarbert
 River Gour
 River Scaddle
 Cona River
 Garvan River
 South Garvan River (Rs)
 North Garvan River (Ls)
 Dubh Lighe
 Fionn Lighe
 An t-Suileag

South-west Highlands

Flowing into the Atlantic Ocean between Corpach at the head of Loch Linnhe and the Mull of Kintyre
 River Lochy
 River Lundy (L)
 River Loy (R)
 River Spean (L)
 The Cour (L)
 River Roy (R)
 River Treig (L)
 Allt na Lairige (flows into Loch Treig)
 Abhainn Rath (flows into Loch Treig)
 Abhainn Ghuilbinn (L) (River Ossian upstream of Loch Ghuilbinn)
 River Pattack (flows into Loch Laggan)
 River Arkaig (R) (flows into Loch Lochy)
 River Mallie (R) (flows into Loch Arkaig)
 River Gloy (L) (flows into Loch Lochy)
 River Nevis (known as Water of Nevis upstream)
 River Kiachnish
 Abhainn Righ
 River Leven
 Allt na Caim (R) (flows into Blackwater Reservoir)
 Black Water (flows into Blackwater Reservoir)
 River Coe
 River Duror
 River Creran
 River Ure (L)
 River Esragan
 River Etive
 River Coupall (R)
 River Kinglass
 River Liver
 River Noe
Awe catchment
 River Awe
 River Orchy (flows into Loch Awe)
 River Strae (R)
 River Lochy (L)
 Allt Kinglass (R)
 Water of Tulla (L) (flows into Loch Tulla)
 Abhainn Shira (R) (flows into Loch Tulla)
 Archan River (R)
 Keppochan River (L)
 River Avich (L) (flows into Loch Awe)
 Kames River (R) (flow into Loch Awe)
 River Liever (L) (flows into Loch Awe)
Simple coastal catchments
 River Nant
 Feochan
 Feochan Mhor or River Nell (Rs)
 Feochan Bheag (Ls)
 River Euchar
 River Oude
 Barbreck River
 River Add
 Martin Burn (R)
 Abhainn na Cuile
 Bardaravine River
 Barr Water
 Machrihanish Water

Firth of Clyde

Rivers discharging into the Firth of Clyde between the Mull of Kintyre and Mull of Galloway. Rivers on Arran are found in the islands section.

Simple coastal catchments
 Breackerie Water
 Conie Water
 Glenlussa Water
 Saddell Water
 Carradale Water
 Claonaig Water
 Skipness River
 Leacann Water
 Douglas Water
 River Aray
 River Shira
 River Fyne
 Kinglas Water
 Kilfinan Burn
 River Auchalick
 River Ruel
 River Eachaig
 River Massan (R)
 River Cur (flows into Loch Eck)
 River Finart
 River Goil
 Croe Water
 Loin Water
Clyde catchment
 River Clyde
 River Leven (R)
 Fruin Water (R) (flows into Loch Lomond)
 Endrick Water (L) (flows into Loch Lomond)
 Blane Water (L)
 Luss Water (R) (flows into Loch Lomond)
 Douglas Water (R) (flows into Loch Lomond)
 Inveruglas Water (R) (flows into Loch Lomond)
 River Falloch  (flows into head of Loch Lomond)
 Dubh Eas (R)
 River Cart
 Black Cart Water (L)
 River Gryffe (L)
 Gryfe Water (Ls)
 Green Water (Rs)
 White Cart Water (L)
 Levern Water (L)
 Brock Burn
 Auldhouse Burn
 Broom Burn
 Capelrig Burn
 Kittoch Water
 Earn Water
 Brackenrig Burn
 Borland Burn
 Polnoon Water
 River Kelvin (R)
 Allander Water (R)
 Luggie Water (L)
 Glazert Water (R)
 Rotten Calder Water (L)
 North Calder Water (R)
 South Calder Water (R)
 Avon Water (L)
 Cander Water (R)
 Glengavel Water (R)
 River Nethan (L)
 Mouse Water (R)
 Douglas Water (L)
 Medwin Water
 North Medwin (Rs)
 South Medwin (Ls)
 Duneaton Water (L)
 Snar Water (R)
 Camps water (R)
 Glengonnar Water (L)
 Elvan Water (L)
 Daer Water
 Portrail Water (L)
Simple coastal catchments
 Noddsdale Water
 Gogo Water
Garnock catchment
 River Garnock
 Lugton Water (L)
 Rye Water (R)
Irvine catchment
 River Irvine
 Annick Water (R)
 Fenwick Water (R)
 Craufurdland Water (R)
 Cessnock Water (L)
Ayr catchment
 River Ayr
 Water of Coyle (L)
 Lugar Water (L)
 Burnock Water (L)
 Bellow Water (Rs)
 Glenmuir Water (Ls)
 Guelt Water (L)
 Greenock Water (R)
Doon catchment
 River Doon
 Carrick Lane (L) (flows into Loch Doon)
 Whitespout Lane (Ls)
 Eglin Lane (Rs)
 Gala Lane (flows into head of Loch Doon)
Simple coastal catchments
 Water of Girvan
 River Stinchar
 Water of Tig (L)
 Duisk River (L)

Solway Firth

Mull of Galloway to Gretna; rivers flowing into the Irish Sea and Solway Firth

Water of Luce catchment
 Water of Luce
 Main Water of Luce (Rs)
 Cross water of Luce (Ls)
Bladnoch catchment
 River Bladnoch
 Tarf Water (R)
 Black Burn (R)
Cree catchment
 River Cree
 Palnure Burn (L)
 Penkiln Burn (L)
 Water of Minnoch (L)
 Water of Trool (L)
 Moneypool Burn
Water of Fleet catchment
 Water of Fleet
 Skyre Burn (R)
 Little Water of Fleet (Ls)
 Big Water of Fleet (Rs)
Dee catchment
 River Dee (known also as 'Black Water of Dee' above confluence with Water of Ken)
 Tarff Water (R)
 Water of Ken (L)
 Polharrow Burn (R)
 Water of Deugh (R)
 Carsphairn Lane (R)
Urr catchment
 Urr Water
 Kirkgunzeon Lane (L)
Nith catchment
 River Nith
 New Abbey Pow (R)
 Cargen Water (R)
 Cluden Water (R)
 Cairn Water (Ls)
 Castlefairn Water (Rs)
 Dalwhat Water (Ls)
 Old Water (Rs)
 Scaur Water (R) (or Scar Water)
 Shinnel Water (R)
 Cample Water (L)
 Carron Water (L)
 Mennock Water (L)
 Cairn Water??
 Euchan Water (R)
 Crawick Water (L)
 Wanlock Water (Ls)
 Spango Water (Rs)
Minor catchment
 Lochar Water
Annan catchment
 River Annan
 Mein Water (L)
 Water of Milk (L)
 Corrie Water (R)
 Dryfe Water (L)
 Kinnel Water (R)
 Water of Ae (R)
 Capel Water (R)
 Broadshaw Water (R)
 Wamphray Water (L)
 Moffat Water (L)
 Evan Water (R)
(Border) Esk catchment
 River Esk, Dumfries and Galloway (a.k.a. 'Border' Esk)
 Kirtle Water (R) (enters tidal section)
 River Sark (R) (straddles the border in its lower reaches, enters tidal section)
 River Lyne (L)
Liddel Water (L)
 Kershope Burn (L)
 Hermitage Water (R)
 Roughley Burn (L)
 Whitrope Burn (L)
 Tarras Water (L)
 Wauchope Water (R)
 Ewes Water (L)
 Meggat Water (L)
 White Esk (Ls)
 Garwald Water (R)
 Black Esk (Rs)

Further tributaries of the Esk lie wholly in England - see List of rivers of England.

Rivers on Scottish islands
Most of the Scottish islands are too small to maintain watercourses of any great length or size, and are frequently indented by numerous long bays and inlets which further break up the landscape. However a disproportionate number of their watercourses bear the name 'river', though many are relatively tiny.

Arran

 The numerous small watercourses on Arran are listed anticlockwise from Brodick.
 Glencloy Water
 Glenrosa Water
 South Sannox Burn
 North Sannox Burn
 Abhainn Mór
 Iorsa Water
 Machrie Water
 Black Water (upper reaches known as Clauchan Water)
 Sliddery Water
 Torrylinn Water (also known as Kilmory Water)
 Benlister Burn
 Glenashdale Burn (a.k.a. Allt Delphin)

Skye and the Inner Hebrides

Islay
 There are numerous watercourses on Islay, many of which though short are termed 'rivers'. They are listed anticlockwise from Port Askaig.
 Doodilmore River
 Gortanaoid River
 Saligo River
 River Drolsay
 River Sorn
 River Laggan
 Duich River (L) (upper reaches known as Torra River)
 Kilennan River (L)
 Barr River
 Machrie River
 Glenegedale River (L)
 Kintra River
 Kilbride River
 Ardilistry River
 Kintour River
 Claggain River

Jura
 There are numerous watercourses on Jura, some of which though short are termed 'rivers'. They are listed anticlockwise from Feolin Ferry.
 Corran River
 Lussan River
 Shian River
 Glenbatrick River

Mull

There are numerous watercourses on Mull, some of which though short are termed 'rivers'.They are listed anticlockwise from Tobermory.
 Tobermory River
 River Bellart
 River Bà (Glencannel River flows into Loch Bà)
 Scarisdale River
 Coladoir River
 Leidle River
 Beach River
 Lussa River
 Scallastle River
 River Forsa
 Aros River
 Ledmore River (Ls)
 Allt an Lon Biolaireich (Rs)

Rùm
 There are a number of watercourses on Rùm, some of which are named as 'rivers'. They are listed anticlockwise from Kinloch.
 Kinloch River
 Kilmory River
 Abhainn Rangail
 Dibidil River

Isle of Skye
Listed anticlockwise around the coast from Kyleakin. Many small watercourses, which would in other areas be named as 'burn' or 'allt', bear the name 'river' in Skye.
 Broadford River
 River Sligachan
 Allt Dearg Mòr
 Varragill River
 River Leasgeary
 River Chracaig
 Lealt River
 Stenscholl River (upper reaches known as Kilmartin River)
 River Brogaig
 Kilmaluag River
 River Rha
 River Conon
 River Hinnisdal
 River Romesdal
 River Haultin
 River Snizort
 Lòn an Eireannaich (R)
 Abhainn an Acha-leathain
 Tungadal River
 River Tora
 Treaslane River
 Bay River
 River Horneval
 Osdale River
 Hamara River
 Lorgill River
 Dibidal River
 Roskhill River
 Caroy River
 River Ose
 Amar River
 Sumardale River
 River Drynoch
 Viskigill Burn
 River Talisker
 Eynort River
 River Brittle
 Scavaig River
 Abhainn Camas Fhionnairigh
 Ord River
 Kylerhea River

Outer Hebrides
Lewis
 Abhainn Ghriais
 Abhainn Lacasdail
 Abhainn Ghrioda (Greeta River or River Creed)
 Abhainn Arnoil
 Abhainn Bharabhais

Orkney

Mainland
 Burn of Ayreland
 Mill Dam Burn, Shapinsay, Orkney Islands

Shetland
Mainland
  Burn of Weisdale
  Burn of Sandwater/Burn of Pettawater

Listing by length
Various measurements are provided for the lengths of Scottish rivers. The table below distinguishes between the river alone and the river plus tidal waters, which many sources use. In all cases the distance is for the longest distance through the catchment area not just the distance of that portion of it which the named river covers excluding upstream tributaries.

Listing by area of catchment
The major rivers of Scotland, in order of catchment, are:
River Tay c. 
River Tweed 
River Spey 

Note: Imperial figures from quoted source; and metric figures less certain.

Shared names
A number of Scottish rivers have identical or very similar names which can be a source of confusion. These are some of the main ones. The symbol '>' is used here to signify 'tributary of':

Ale
 Ale Water ( > Eye Water, Eyemouth); Ale Water ( > Tweed)
Allan
 Allan Water ( > Forth); Allan Water ( > Teviot > Tweed)
Almond
 River Almond (Lothian); River Almond ( > Tay)
Avon
 River Avon (Falkirk); River Avon ( > Spey); Avon Water ( > Clyde)
Ba
 River Bà (Mull); River Bà (Rannoch Moor)
Bannock Burn
 Bannock Burn ( > River Helmsdale); Bannock Burn ( > Forth)
Barr
 Barr River (Morvern); Barr River ( > River Laggan, Islay); Barr Water (Kintyre)
Black Burn
 Black Burn – commonly occurring including Lossie, Tweed, Water of Luce
Black Water
 Black Water – very frequent
Calder
 River Calder ( > Spey, Highand); North Calder Water ( > Clyde); South Calder Water ( > Clyde)
Carron
 River Carron (Forth); River Carron (Sutherland); River Carron (Wester Ross); Carron Water (Aberdeenshire); Carron Water ( > Nith)
Conon
 River Conon (Skye); River Conon ( > Cromarty Firth)
Dee
 River Dee, Aberdeenshire (Aberdeen); River Dee (Galloway)
Dibidal, Dibidil
 Dibidal River (Skye); Dibidil River (Rùm)
Dorback
 Dorback Burn ( > Nethy > Spey); Dorback Burn ( > Findhorn)
Douglas
 Douglas Water ( > Clyde); Douglas Water (Loch Lomond); Douglas Water (Loch Fyne)
Eden
 Eden Water (Tweed); River Eden (Fife)
Elrick
 Elrick Burn (Don); Elrick Burn (Findhorn)
Enrick, Endrick
 River Endrick (Loch Lomond); River Enrick (Loch Ness)
Esk, North Esk, South Esk
 River Esk, Dumfries and Galloway ('Border Esk'), River Esk, Lothian (Lothian); River North Esk; River North Esk (Lothian); River South Esk; River South Esk (Lothian)
Gala
 Gala Lane (Loch Doon); Gala Water ( > Tweed)
Garry
 River Garry (Loch Oich); River Garry ( > Tummel > Tay)
Glass
 River Glass (Easter Ross); River Glass, Strathglass ( > Beauly)
Glenmore
 Glenmore River; Glenmore River
Isla
 River Isla ( > Deveron); River Isla ( > Tay)
Kilmory
 Kilmory River (Rùm); Kilmory Water
Kinglas, Kinglass
 Kinglas Water; River Kinglass
Kinloch
 Kinloch River (Rùm); Kinloch River; Kinloch River
Ledmore
 Ledmore River (Kirkaig); Ledmore River (Mull)
Leven
 River Leven (Argyll); River Leven ( > Clyde); River Leven, Fife (Fife)
Lochy, Lochay
 River Lochay (Tay); River Lochy (Great Glen); River Lochy (Awe)
Lunan
 Lunan Burn (Tay); Lunan Water
Lyne
 River Lyne (Border Esk); Lyne Water (Tweed)
Machrie
 Machrie River (Islay); Machrie Water (Arran)
Meggat, Megget
 Meggat Water ( > Border Esk); Megget Water ( > Tweed)
Mor (This is merely a Gaelic adjective meaning "large" or "great")
 Abhainn Mór (Arran); Abhainn Mor (Kirkaig)
Shiel
 River Shiel (Loch Shiel); River Shiel ( > Loch Duich)
Tarf, Tarff
 Tarf Water ( > Tilt > Garry > Tummel > Tay); Tarf Water ( > River Bladnoch (Galloway)); Tarff Water ( > River Dee, Galloway); River Tarff, Fort Augustus ( > Loch Ness); Water of Tarf ( > River North Esk, Angus/Aberdeenshire )

See also
 Rivers and Fisheries Trusts of Scotland (RAFTS)
 The Rivers Trust
 List of waterway societies in the United Kingdom
 List of rivers of England
 List of rivers of Ireland
 List of rivers of the Isle of Man
 List of rivers of Wales
 Longest rivers of the United Kingdom

Footnotes

Scotland

Rivers
Rivers